Silver Bay may refer to:

Silver Bay (Alaska), a fjord located south of the town of Sitka
Silver Bay, Minnesota, a small city
Silver Bay (New Jersey), a bay located near Silverton, New Jersey
Silver Bay, New York, a hamlet
Silver Bay, Ontario, a community within Port Colborne